Abdollahi-ye Sofla (also Romanized as ‘Abdollāhī-ye Soflá; also known as ‘Abdollāhī-ye Pā’īn and Abdullahi) is a village in Rostam-e Yek Rural District, in the Central District of Rostam County, Fars Province, Iran. At the 2006 census, its population was 239, in 62 families.

References 

Populated places in Rostam County